Sylvia Noble Tesh, born 1937, is an American academic, professor at Yale and the University of Michigan for over two decades, and currently a professor at the University of Arizona. She earned her Ph.D. at the University of Hawaii in political science. She also served as a Fulbright professor at the Universidade Federal da Bahia, in Salvador, Brazil, in 1999. She is best known for her well-cited book Hidden Arguments: Political Ideology and Disease Prevention Policy. Her most recent book, Uncertain Hazards Environmental Activists and Scientific Proof, was published in 2000 by Cornell University Press.

Selected bibliography
 Tesh, Sylvia Noble. “Environment, Science, and Culture.” In Environmental Crisis or Crisis of Epistemology?: Working for Sustainable Knowledge and Environmental Justice. New York: Morgan James Pub., 2011. 
 Tesh, Sylvia Noble. “Reducing Deforestation in the Brazilian Amazon: Paradoxes of Environmentalism.” Jean Monnet Working Paper 09/10 (2010). http://jeanmonnetprogram.org/wp-content/uploads/2014/12/100901.pdf.
 Tesh, Sylvia Noble, and Eduardo Paes-Machado. “Sewers, Garbage, and Environmentalism in Brazil.” The Journal of Environment & Development 13, no. 1 (March 2004): 42–72. https://doi.org/10.1177/1070496503260971.
 Tesh, Sylvia Noble. “The Internet and the Grass Roots.” Organization & Environment 15, no. 3 (September 2002): 336–39. https://doi.org/10.1177/1086026602153012.
 Tesh, Sylvia Noble. Uncertain Hazards: Environmental Activists and Scientific Proof. Ithaca, N.Y: Cornell University Press, 2000. https://doi.org/10.7591/9781501717581
 Tesh, Sylvia Noble. “Citizen Experts in Environmental Risk.” Policy Sciences, 1999, 20. https://doi.org/10.1023/A:1004398228075.
 Tesh, Sylvia Noble, and Bruce A. Williams. “Identity Politics, Disinterested Politics, and Environmental Justice.” Polity 28, no. 3 (March 1996): 285–305. https://doi.org/10.2307/3235374.
 Tesh, Sylvia Noble. “Miasma and ‘Social Factors’ in Disease Causality: Lessons from the Nineteenth Century.” Journal of Health Politics, Policy and Law 20, no. 4 (1995): 1001–24. https://doi.org/10.1215/03616878-20-4-1001.
 Tesh, Sylvia Noble, and Bruce A. Williams. “Science, Identity Politics, and Environmental Racism.” In American Political Science Association Meeting. New York, 1994.
 Tesh, Sylvia Noble. “Causal Debates in Environmentalism.” Journal of Public Health Policy 15, no. 3 (1994): 298. https://doi.org/10.2307/3342907.
 Tesh, Sylvia Noble. “New Social Movements and New Ideas.” In Annual Meeting of the American Political Science Association. Washington, DC, 1993.
 Tesh, Sylvia Noble. “Environmentalism, Pre-Environmentalism, and Public Policy.” Policy Sciences 26, no. 1 (February 1993): 1–20. https://doi.org/10.1007/BF01006494.
 Tesh, Sylvia Noble. Hidden Arguments: Political Ideology and Disease Prevention Policy. New Brunswick, N.J., U.S.A: Rutgers University Press, 1988.
 Tesh, Sylvia Noble, Carolyn Tuohy, Tom Christoffel, Trevor Hancock, Judy Norsigian, Elena Nightingale, and Leon Robertson. "The meaning of healthy public policy." Health Promotion International 2, no. 3 (1987): 257-262. volume 2, issue 3 (1987). 1987.  https://doi.org/10.1093/heapro/2.3.257
 Tesh, Sylvia Noble. “Health Education in Cuba: A Preface.” International Journal of Health Services 16, no. 1 (January 1986): 87–104. https://doi.org/10.2190/HAA9-DU1Q-0QJR-4JE9.
 Tesh, Sylvia Noble. “The Politics of Stress: The Case of Air Traffic Control.” International Journal of Health Services 14, no. 4 (October 1984): 569–87. https://doi.org/10.2190/JH2E-F62P-WMX8-7NQF.
 Tesh, Sylvia Noble. “In Support of ‘Single-Issue’ Politics.” Political Science Quarterly 99, no. 1 (1984): 27. https://doi.org/10.2307/2150257.
 Tesh, Sylvia Noble. “Political Ideology and Public Health in the Nineteenth Century.” International Journal of Health Services 12, no. 2 (April 1982): 321–42. https://doi.org/10.2190/4REP-0NGX-H2LA-E0AF.
 Tesh, Sylvia Noble. “Disease Causality and Politics.” Journal of Health Politics, Policy and Law 6, no. 3 (Fall 1981): 369–90. https://doi.org/10.1215/03616878-6-3-369.
 Tesh, Sylvia Noble. “The Politics of Public Health Ideology and Disease Causality.” University of Hawaii, 1980. https://scholarspace.manoa.hawaii.edu/bitstream/10125/10098/uhm_phd_8111346_r.pdf.
 Tesh, Sylvia Noble. “TV Ads & Nutrition.” The Honolulu Advertiser. July 12, 1978.
 Tesh, Sylvia Noble. “Decentralize Democracy.” The Honolulu Advertiser. April 14, 1977.
 Tesh, Sylvia Noble. “Campaign Funding.” The Honolulu Advertiser. October 2, 1973.

References 

American women political scientists
American political scientists
Yale University faculty
University of Michigan faculty
University of Arizona faculty
Living people
Year of birth missing (living people)
University of Hawaiʻi alumni
American women academics
21st-century American women